Alicia Rodríguez Fernández (born 2 May 1935) is a Spanish-Mexican former actress. She appeared in a number of theaters, films, and television series. She was active during the Golden Age of Mexican cinema.

Life and career
Rodríguez was born in Málaga, Spain on 2 May 1935 as Alicia Rodríguez Fernández. While she was still a baby, her family immigrated to Mexico due to the Spanish Civil War.

Rodríguez began her acting career in theatre as a child actress. In 1946, she received an Ariel Award for her performance in the film El secreto de la solterona. Then, she was very well-known and loved among her fans.

Selected filmography

References

External links
 

1935 births
Living people
People from Málaga
Spanish film actresses
Spanish television actresses
Spanish emigrants to Mexico